Jolanta Irena Szczypińska (24 June 1957 – 8 December 2018) was a Polish politician.

Biography 
After professionally working as a nurse, she became a member of the Sejm (the lower House of Parliament) after Wiesław Walendziak had stepped down in March 2004. 
On 25 September 2005 she was a candidate for the 26th Gdynia district, running on the Law and Justice list, and was elected Sejm member, as well as on 21 October 2007, on 9 October 2011 and on 25 October 2015.

In 2007, following rumours that she was in relationship with Poland's prime minister Jarosław Kaczyński, the airline Ryanair launched an advertising campaign which pictured the two politicians under the headline Are they planning a honeymoon trip? Szczypińska took legal action to prevent publication.

See also
 List of Sejm members (2005–07)
 List of Sejm members (2007–11)
 List of Sejm members (2011–15)
 List of Sejm members (2015–19)

References

External links
 Jolanta Szczypińska - parliamentary page - includes declarations of interest, voting record, and transcripts of speeches.
Home page

1957 births
2018 deaths
People from Słupsk
Polish nurses
Law and Justice politicians
Members of the Polish Sejm 2001–2005
Women members of the Sejm of the Republic of Poland
Members of the Polish Sejm 2005–2007
21st-century Polish women politicians
Members of the Polish Sejm 2007–2011
Members of the Polish Sejm 2011–2015